1967 – Sunshine Tomorrow is an expanded reissue of the 1967 album Wild Honey by American rock band the Beach Boys. It was released by Capitol Records on June 30, 2017 and consists largely of previously unreleased material that the group had produced after abandoning Smile in mid-1967. Included is the first ever complete stereo mix of Wild Honey, live performances, outtakes, session highlights, and additional material sourced from Smiley Smile (1967) and the unreleased live effort Lei'd in Hawaii, both of which immediately preceded the Wild Honey sessions.

On December 8, 2017, the reissue was followed with two digital-exclusive compilations: 1967 – Sunshine Tomorrow 2: The Studio Sessions and 1967 – Live Sunshine. They include more than 100 tracks that had been left off the original release. In 2018, the set was followed with Wake the World: The Friends Sessions.

Background

The album, which focuses on the Beach Boys' post-Smile 1967 recordings, includes a new stereo mix of Wild Honey produced by compilers Mark Linett and Alan Boyd. The mix was also made available as a separate vinyl release. The title derives from the Wild Honey track "Let the Wind Blow", which contains the couplet "take away their sorrows, give them sunshine tomorrow."

Critical reception

AllMusic critic Stephen Thomas Erlewine wrote that the album "feels like a gift: it bolsters the argument that the period following Pet Sounds and Smile was no less creative than that golden age. ...  Wild Honey appropriately takes center stage on this project, with a vivid new stereo mix." Pitchforks said that it "finds them firing in all creative directions at once for a brief, beautiful moment just as their wave started to recede. ... the magic of Sunshine Tomorrow is that the Beach Boys are all of these at once: chaotic and relaxed, naive and sophisticated, pop-oriented and intimate. Brian is both present and slipping away." Music journalist Tim Sommer believed the new stereo mix transformed Wild Honey from a "flat and peculiar ... afterthought of Smiley Smile" to a "deep and delightful, human, rollicking, humming and rolling [album]."

Pastes Robert Ham surmised that the "objective, it seems, is to inspire a collective reappraisal of a period in the band’s career when they were still respected critically and beloved commercially, but struggling creatively ... 1967 succeeds in that humble goal but just barely." Steve Marinucci from AXS characterized the original albums as "confusing", and that "there's little here to recommend to casual listeners, though certainly Beach Boys diehards will be attracted to it."

Track listing

Disc one

All subsequent tracks were previously unreleased.

Disc two

Sequels
These two companion albums were issued on December 8, 2017 as digital exclusives.

1967 – Sunshine Tomorrow 2: The Studio Sessions

1967 – Live Sunshine

Charts

See also
 The Beach Boys bootleg recordings
 List of unreleased songs recorded by the Beach Boys

References

The Beach Boys compilation albums
Capitol Records compilation albums
2017 compilation albums
Albums produced by Mark Linett
Reissue albums